In the mathematical field of real analysis, a simple function is a  real (or complex)-valued function over a subset of the real line, similar to a step function. Simple functions are sufficiently "nice" that using them makes mathematical reasoning, theory, and proof easier. For example, simple functions attain only a finite number of values. Some authors also require simple functions to be measurable; as used in practice, they invariably are.

A basic example of a simple function is the floor function over the half-open interval [1, 9), whose only values are {1, 2, 3, 4, 5, 6, 7, 8}. A more advanced example is the Dirichlet function over the real line, which takes the value 1 if x is rational and 0 otherwise. (Thus the "simple" of "simple function" has a technical meaning somewhat at odds with common language.) All step functions are simple.

Simple functions are used as a first stage in the development of theories of integration, such as the Lebesgue integral, because it is easy to define integration for a simple function and also it is straightforward to approximate more general functions by sequences of simple functions.

Definition

Formally, a simple function is a finite linear combination of indicator functions of measurable sets. More precisely, let (X, Σ) be a measurable space. Let A1, ..., An ∈ Σ be a sequence of disjoint measurable sets, and let a1, ..., an be a sequence of real or complex numbers. A simple function is a function  of the form

where  is the indicator function of the set A.

Properties of simple functions

Integration of simple functions

If a measure μ is defined on the space (X,Σ), the integral of f with respect to μ is

if all summands are finite.

Relation to Lebesgue integration
The above integral of simple functions can be extended to a more general class of functions, which is how the Lebesgue integral is defined. This extension is based on the following fact.

 Theorem. Any non-negative measurable function  is the pointwise limit of a monotonic increasing sequence of non-negative simple functions.

The proof proceeds as follows. Let  be a non-negative measurable function defined over the measure space . For each , subdivide the co-domain of  into  intervals,  of which have length . That is, for each , define

which are disjoint and cover the non-negative real line.

Now define the sets 
 for 
which are measurable because  is assumed to be measurable.

Then the increasing sequence of simple functions 
 

Note that, when  is bounded, the convergence is uniform.

See also
Bochner measurable function

References 
. Introduction to Measure and Probability, 1966, Cambridge.
. Real and Functional Analysis, 1993, Springer-Verlag.
. Real and Complex Analysis, 1987, McGraw-Hill.
. Real Analysis, 1968, Collier Macmillan.

Real analysis
Measure theory
Types of functions